Christian Pauli (born 30 January 1992) is an Austrian-German footballer who plays as a striker for Austrian third-tier side FC Kitzbühel.

He made his debut for VfL Osnabrück in April 2011, as a substitute for a Benjamin Siegert in a 4–0 defeat to Hertha BSC in the 2. Bundesliga. He played in the last five matches of the 2010–11 season, and in the second leg of a playoff against Dynamo Dresden, which Osnabrück lost, relegating them to the 3. Liga. The following season, he made eighteen appearances, scoring one goal. In January 2013, he signed for SV Wilhelmshaven on a six-month loan.

References

External links

1992 births
Living people
German people of Austrian descent
Sportspeople from Osnabrück
German footballers
Austrian footballers
Footballers from Lower Saxony
Association football forwards
VfL Osnabrück players
SV Wilhelmshaven players
BSV Schwarz-Weiß Rehden players
2. Bundesliga players
3. Liga players